Luise Meyer-Schützmeister (1915 in Germany – 1981) was a senior physicist at the Argonne National Laboratory, where she was involved in the measurement of gamma rays produced in nuclear reactions, and also conducted studies on the behavior of atomic nuclei. She received her Ph.D at the Technical University of Berlin during World War II. In the 1950s, she and her husband, fellow physicist Peter Meyer, emigrated to the United States. There, she became a research associate for the Institute for Nuclear Studies at the University of Chicago. Meyer-Schützmeister became an associate scientist at the Argonne National Laboratory in 1956; later, in 1973, she was promoted to the position of senior scientist, the job title she held until her death in 1981.

The Luise Meyer-Schutzmeister Award was named after her, and was created by the Association for Women in Science for women graduate students in physics.

Select publications

References

External links
 Bio at UCLA

1915 births
1981 deaths
20th-century German physicists
20th-century American physicists
20th-century American women scientists
Argonne National Laboratory people
American nuclear physicists
American women physicists
German emigrants to the United States
German nuclear physicists
German women physicists
Women nuclear physicists
20th-century German women